The  National University of Modern Languages, Rawalpindi, formerly known as APCOMS, is a university branch located in Rawalpindi, Punjab, Pakistan and is part of National University of Modern Languages.

History
It was founded as Army Public College of Management & Sciences (APCOMS) in 1999 under the administrative control of the Inspector General Training & Evaluation (IGT&E), Pakistan Army. Its engineering programs are affiliated with University of Engineering and Technology, Taxila (UET, Taxila) and management programs are affiliated with National University of Modern Languages, Islamabad (NUML). 

Initially, it started only management sciences, computer science and software engineering. Then, it started electrical engineering in 2007 and civil engineering in 2018. The founding principal Brig. Hubdar Ahmed Madni remained the principal from 1999 to 10 July 2020.  

Asif Iqbal officially took over as the new principal on 13 July 2020. Subsequently, it has been converted into Rawalpindi branch of National University of Modern Languages. In September 2020, Brig. Muhammad Ibrahim officially took over as the new Pro-Rector of National University of Modern Languages Rawalpindi.

Academics

Departments
The university branch currently consists of following departments:

Department of Electrical Engineering
Department of Computer Science and Engineering 
Department of Business Administration
Department of Accounting and Finance
Department of Civil Engineering

Degrees

See also
 National University of Modern Languages, Islamabad
 University of Engineering and Technology, Taxila

References

External links 
 

Pakistan Army universities and colleges
Engineering universities and colleges in Pakistan
1999 establishments in Pakistan
Educational institutions established in 1999
Universities and colleges in Rawalpindi District